Del rosa al amarillo (English: From pink to yellow) is a 1963 Spanish film. It was directed and written by Manuel Summers.

The film's plot explores two love stories involving a young couple and an elderly couple.

Cast
 Cristina Galbó
 Pedro Díez del Corral
 José Vicente Cerrudo - Valentín 
 Lina Onesti - Josefa

References

1963 films
1960s Spanish-language films
Spanish black-and-white films
Films directed by Manuel Summers
1960s Spanish films